Thomas Hamer (born 16 August 1998) is an English British swimmer. Hamer is Commonwealth , European & World Champion. He has held Previous World Records in the 200m freestyle event and has held many British records in other swimming strokes. Hamer competes mainly in freestyle and individual medley  preferring shorter distances. His first international competition was in 2014 Commonwealth Games Glasgow and took a sliver medal in the 200m freestyle at 15 years of age.

Career history

2014 Commonwealth Games
 Silver medal, 200m Freestyle Swimming - first person to represent GB in this event
2016 IPC Swimming European Championships
 European Champion (first), 200m Freestyle
 Bronze medal, 200m individual medley
2016 Paralympic Games
 Silver medal, 200m individual medley SM14

Hamer holds the British records for S14 50m, 200m, and 400m freestyle events, and the SM14 200m individual medley.

References

External links
 
 
 
 

1998 births
Living people
People from Rawtenstall
English male freestyle swimmers
British male backstroke swimmers
Swimmers at the 2014 Commonwealth Games
Commonwealth Games silver medallists for England
Commonwealth Games medallists in swimming
Swimmers at the 2016 Summer Paralympics
Medalists at the 2016 Summer Paralympics
Paralympic silver medalists for Great Britain
Swimmers at the 2018 Commonwealth Games
Swimmers at the 2022 Commonwealth Games
Commonwealth Games gold medallists for England
Medalists at the World Para Swimming Championships
Medalists at the World Para Swimming European Championships
Paralympic medalists in swimming
Paralympic swimmers of Great Britain
S14-classified Paralympic swimmers
21st-century English people
Medallists at the 2014 Commonwealth Games
Medallists at the 2018 Commonwealth Games